El Puerto de Liverpool S.A. de C.V., commonly known as Liverpool, is a mid-to-high end retailer which operates the largest chain of department stores in Mexico. It operates 136 stores under the Liverpool name, 131 stores under the Suburbia name, and 27 shopping centers, including Perisur and Galerías Monterrey.

Its headquarters are in Santa Fe, a suburb and a main business center in Mexico City.

Liverpool stores

History
Liverpool, first called The Cloth Case, was founded in 1847 by Jean Baptiste Ebrard, a Frenchman who first started selling clothes in cases in Downtown Mexico City. In 1872, he started importing merchandise from Europe .  Much of the merchandise was shipped via Liverpool, England, prompting Ebrard to adopt the name Liverpool for his store, in 1862 he opened its second store and since then it has continued growing .

Liverpool Interlomas Store

In 2011, Liverpool opened a high-profile store at Paseo Interlomas, in the Interlomas, a major upscale suburban residential and business center in Greater Mexico City. The structure was designed by Rojkind Arquitectos. This three-story structure, dubbed the OVNI (UFO) for its distinctive metallic oval look, is clad in a double-layered stainless steel surface fabricated by Zahner. The 30,000m2 department store includes a rooftop recreational park.  Several design firms were involved in various aspects of the project. The interiors were done by American architecture and design firm FRCH Design Worldwide, the rooftop garden by Thomas Balsley and the gourmet space by JHP Design.

Liverpool locations

Greater Mexico City

 Centro las Américas, Ecatepec, State of Mexico
 Ciudad Jardín Bicentenario, Nezahuacóyotl, State of Mexico
 Cosmopol, Coacalco, State of Mexico
 Galerías Atizapán, Atizapán, State of Mexico
 Galerías Coapa, Tlalpan
 Galerias Insurgentes, Colonia del Valle
 Historic center of Mexico City, 20 de Noviembre street, freestanding 
 Mítikah, Xoco, opening late 2022
 Parque Lindavista, Gustavo A. Madero 
 Paseo Interlomas, Interlomas, State of Mexico (see article)
 Parque Delta, col. Piedad Narvarte
 Perinorte, Cuautitlán, State of Mexico
 Perisur, Coyoacán borough
 Plaza Tlalne Fashion Mall, Tlalnepantla, State of Mexico
 Polanco, Calzada Mariano Escobedo, freestanding 
 Centro Santa Fe, Santa Fe
 Plaza Satélite, Naucalpan, State of Mexico
 Parque Tezontle, Iztapalapa
 Tecámac Power Center, State of Mexico
 Toreo Parque Central, Naucalpan, State of Mexico

Under construction

Guadalajara (Distrito La Perla)
Tijuana (Plaza Península)

Northern Mexico

Central-West Mexico

Central-Southern Mexico

Southeast Mexico (Mayan Zone)

Central & Southern Mexico
Acapulco (2)
Aguascalientes (2)
Atlixco
Campeche
Cancún (2)
Celaya
Chilpancingo
Ciudad del Carmen 
Coatzacoalcos (2)
Colima
Comitán
Córdoba
Cuautla
Cuernavaca
Chetumal
Chilpancingo
Duty Free Cancún
Duty Free Los Cabos
Duty Free Playa del Carmen
Guadalajara (9):
Guadalajara (2)
Zapopan (5)
Tlaquepaque
Tlajomulco de Zúñiga
Guanajuato
Irapuato
León (2)
Mérida (2)
Morelia (2)
Oaxaca (2)
Orizaba
Pachuca
Playa del Carmen
Poza Rica
Puebla (4)
Puerto Vallarta
Salamanca
Salina Cruz
San Luis Potosí (2)
San Juan del Río
San Miguel de Allende
Santiago de Querétaro (3)
Tapachula
Tehuacán
Tepic (2)
Tlaxcala
Toluca (2):
Toluca
Metepec
Tuxtla Gutiérrez (2)
Veracruz (3)
Villahermosa (3)
Xalapa (2)
Zamora

Fashion Fest
Fashion Fest of Liverpool is an annual festival that covers new fashion trends for the new seasons, it has reunited some of the most important supermodels like:  Valeria Mazza, Esther Cañadas, Eva Herzigova, Cindy Crawford, Heidi Klum, Gisele Bündchen, Adriana Lima, Claudia Schiffer, Julianne Moore, Alessandra Ambrosio, Doutzen Kroes, Bar Refaeli, Olivia Wilde, Milla Jovovich, and most recently Irina Shayk

Fábricas de Francia

Stores under the name Fábricas de Francia belonged to Liverpool but did not carry the name. Fábricas de Francia outlets were found in 25 cities, operating and working in the same fashion that Liverpool does. It was announced in 2018 that Liverpool would phase out the Fábricas de Francia brand and all stores were converted to either the Liverpool or Suburbia brand.

Former Fábricas de Francia locations

Northern Mexico
Tijuana, Baja California
Chihuahua
Ciudad Juárez
Ciudad Obregón
Mazatlán
Saltillo

Central & Southern Mexico
Acapulco
Aguascalientes
Apizaco
Coatzacoalcos
Comitán 
Córdoba
Guadalajara (5)
León
Mexico City (7)
Oaxaca (2)
Poza Rica
Puebla
San Luis Potosí
Tapachula
Tepic
Veracruz
Villahermosa 
Xalapa

Shopping malls operated by Liverpool

Perisur
Perinorte
Galerias Atizapan
Galerias Monterrey
Galerias Metepec
Galerias Querétaro
Galerias San Juan Del Río
Galerias Cuernavaca
Galerias Coapa
Galerías Insurgentes
Galerias Celaya
Galerias Chilpancingo 
Galerias Vallarta
Galerias Tabasco
Galerias Mérida
La Isla Mérida
Galerias Saltillo
Galerias Mazatlan
Galerias Acapulco
Galerias Campeche
Galerias Zacatecas
Galerias Serdán, Puebla
Galerias Toluca
Galerias Polanco
Galerias Tlaxcala
Galerias La Paz
Galerias Santa Anita, Guadalajara

See also
Suburbia (department store), a department store chain owned by El Puerto de Liverpool

References

External links

Liverpool 
Fabricas de Francia Official Site 
Liverpool Corporate Site
Liverpool Corporate Site 
Liverpool Presentation of last quarterly report

Department stores of Mexico
Food halls
Retail companies of Mexico
Companies based in Mexico City
Cuajimalpa
Retail companies established in 1847
1847 establishments in Mexico
Companies listed on the Mexican Stock Exchange
Mexican brands